Indiana Jones is an American media franchise based on the adventures of Dr. Henry Walton "Indiana" Jones, Jr., a fictional professor of archaeology, that began in 1981 with the film Raiders of the Lost Ark. In 1984, a prequel, The Temple of Doom, was released, and in 1989, a sequel, The Last Crusade. A fourth film followed in 2008, titled The Kingdom of the Crystal Skull. A fifth film, titled The Dial of Destiny, is in production and is scheduled to be released in 2023. The series was created by George Lucas and stars Harrison Ford as Indiana Jones. The first four films were directed by Steven Spielberg, who worked closely with Lucas during their production.

In 1992, the franchise expanded to a television series with The Young Indiana Jones Chronicles, portraying the character in his childhood and youth, and including adventures with his parents.

Marvel Comics began publishing The Further Adventures of Indiana Jones in 1983, and Dark Horse Comics gained the comic book rights to the character in 1991. Novelizations of the films have been published, as well as many novels with original adventures, including a series of German novels by Wolfgang Hohlbein, twelve novels set before the films published by Bantam Books, and a series set during the character's childhood inspired by the television show. 

Numerous Indiana Jones video games have been released since 1982.

Background
During 1973, George Lucas wrote The Adventures of Indiana Smith. Like Star Wars, it was an opportunity to create a modern version of the movie serials of the 1930s and 1940s. Lucas discussed the concept with Philip Kaufman, who worked with him for several weeks and decided upon the Ark of the Covenant as the MacGuffin. The project was stalled when Clint Eastwood hired Kaufman to write The Outlaw Josey Wales. In May 1977, Lucas was in Maui, trying to escape the worldwide success of Star Wars. His friend and colleague Steven Spielberg was also there, on vacation from work on Close Encounters of the Third Kind. Spielberg told Lucas he was interested in making a James Bond film, but Lucas told him of an idea "better than James Bond", outlining the plot of Raiders of the Lost Ark. Spielberg loved it, calling it "a James Bond film without the hardware", and had the character's surname changed to Jones. Spielberg and Lucas made a deal with Paramount Pictures for five Indiana Jones films.

Spielberg and Lucas aimed to make Indiana Jones and the Temple of Doom much darker, because of their personal moods following their respective breakups and divorces. Lucas made the film a prequel as he did not want the Nazis to be the villains again. He had ideas regarding the Monkey King and a haunted castle, but eventually created the Sankara Stones, that would be used in the film. He hired Willard Huyck and Gloria Katz to write the script as he knew of their interest in Indian culture. The major scenes that were dropped from Raiders of the Lost Ark were included in this film: an escape using a giant rolling gong as a shield, a fall out of a plane in a raft, and a mine cart chase. For the third film, Spielberg revisited the Monkey King and haunted castle concepts, before Lucas suggested the Holy Grail. Spielberg had previously rejected this as too ethereal, but then devised a father-son story and decided that "The Grail that everybody seeks could be a metaphor for a son seeking reconciliation with a father and a father seeking reconciliation with a son."

Following the 1989 release of Indiana Jones and the Last Crusade, Lucas let the series end as he felt he could not think of a good plot device to drive the next installment, and chose instead to produce The Young Indiana Jones Chronicles, which explored the character in his early years. Ford played Indiana in one episode, narrating his adventures in 1920 Chicago. When Lucas shot Ford's role in December 1992, he realized that the scene opened up the possibility of a film with an older Indiana set in the 1950s. The film could reflect a science fiction 1950s B-movie, with aliens as the plot device. Ford disliked the new angle, telling Lucas: "No way am I being in a Steven Spielberg movie like that." Spielberg himself, who depicted aliens in Close Encounters of the Third Kind and E.T. the Extra-Terrestrial, resisted it. Lucas devised a story, which Jeb Stuart turned into a script from October 1993 to May 1994. Lucas wanted Indiana to get married, which would allow Henry Jones Sr. to return, expressing concern over whether his son is happy with what he has accomplished. After learning that Joseph Stalin was interested in psychic warfare, Lucas decided to have Russians as the villains and the aliens to have psychic powers. Following Stuart's next draft, Lucas hired Last Crusade writer Jeffrey Boam to write the next three versions, the last of which was completed in March 1996. Three months later, Independence Day was released, and Spielberg told Lucas he would not make another alien invasion film (or at least not until War of the Worlds in 2005). Lucas decided to focus on the Star Wars prequels instead.

In 2000, Spielberg's son asked when the next Indiana Jones film would be released, which made him interested in reviving the project. The same year, Ford, Lucas, Spielberg, Frank Marshall, and Kathleen Kennedy met during the American Film Institute's tribute to Ford, and decided they wanted to enjoy the experience of making an Indiana Jones film again. Spielberg also found returning to the series a respite from his many dark films during this period. Spielberg and Lucas discussed the central idea of a B-movie involving aliens, and Lucas suggested using crystal skulls to ground the idea. Lucas found these artifacts as fascinating as the Ark, and had intended to feature them for a Young Indiana Jones episode before the show's cancellation. M. Night Shyamalan was hired to write for an intended 2002 shoot, but he was overwhelmed by the task, and claimed it was difficult to get Ford, Spielberg, and Lucas to focus. Stephen Gaghan and Tom Stoppard were also approached.

Frank Darabont, who wrote various Young Indiana Jones episodes, was hired to write in May 2002. His script, titled Indiana Jones and the City of Gods, was set in the 1950s, with ex-Nazis pursuing Jones. Spielberg conceived the idea because of real-life figures such as Juan Perón in Argentina, who allegedly protected Nazi war criminals. Darabont claimed Spielberg loved the script, but Lucas had issues with it, and decided to take over writing himself. Lucas and Spielberg acknowledged that the 1950s setting could not ignore the Cold War, and the Russians were more plausible villains. Spielberg decided he could not satirize the Nazis after directing Schindler's List, while Ford felt "We plum[b] wore the Nazis out." Darabont's main contribution was reintroducing Marion Ravenwood as Indiana's love interest, but he gave them a 13-year-old daughter, which Spielberg decided was too similar to The Lost World: Jurassic Park.

Jeff Nathanson met with Spielberg and Lucas in August 2004, and turned in the next drafts in October and November 2005, titled The Atomic Ants. David Koepp continued on from there, giving his script the subtitle Destroyer of Worlds, based on the J. Robert Oppenheimer quote. It was changed to Kingdom of the Crystal Skull, as Spielberg found this a more inviting title which actually named the plot device. Koepp wanted to depict the character of Mutt as a nerd, but Lucas refused, explaining he had to resemble Marlon Brando in The Wild One; "he needs to be what Indiana Jones's father thought of [him] – the curse returns in the form of his own son – he's everything a father can't stand". Koepp collaborated with Lawrence Kasdan on the film's "love dialogue".

The Walt Disney Company has owned the Indiana Jones intellectual property since its acquisition of Lucasfilm, the series' production company, in 2012, when Lucas sold it for $4 billion. Walt Disney Studios owns the distribution and marketing rights to future Indiana Jones films since 2013, with Paramount retaining the distribution rights to the first four films and receiving "financial participation" from any additional films. Disney will distribute the fifth film Indiana Jones and the Dial of Destiny, which will be directed by James Mangold and produced by Spielberg.

Films

Raiders of the Lost Ark (1981)

The first film is set in 1936. Indiana Jones (Harrison Ford) is hired by government agents to locate the Ark of the Covenant, the gold plated chest containing the stone tablets Moses used to inscribe the Ten Commandments before the Nazi Germans steal it for themselves. The Nazis have teams searching for religious artefacts, including the Ark, which is rumored to make an army that carries the Ark before it invincible. The Nazis are being helped by Indiana's arch-rival and French archaeologist René Belloq (Paul Freeman). With the help of his former lover and tough bar owner Marion Ravenwood (Karen Allen) and his excavator friend Sallah (John Rhys-Davies), Indiana manages to recover the Ark in Egypt. The Nazis steal the Ark and capture Indiana and Marion. Belloq and the Nazis perform a ceremony to open the Ark, but when they do so, all they find inside is sand. Suddenly, spirits come out of the Ark and the Nazis are all killed by the Ark's wrath. Indiana and Marion, who survived by closing their eyes, manage to get the Ark to the United States, where it is stored in a secret government warehouse.

Indiana Jones and the Temple of Doom (1984)

The second film is a prequel set in 1935, a year before Raiders of the Lost Ark. Indiana escapes Chinese gangsters led by Lao Che with the help of singer/actress Willie Scott (Kate Capshaw) and his twelve-year-old sidekick Short Round (Ke Huy Quan). The trio crash-land in India, where they come across a Punjabi village whose children have been kidnapped. The Thuggee cult led by Mola Ram (Amrish Puri) has also taken the holy Sankara Stones, which they will use to take over the world. Indiana manages to overcome Mola Ram's evil power, rescues the children and returns the stones to their rightful place, overcoming his own mercenary nature. The film has been noted as an outlier in the franchise, as it does not feature Indy's university or any antagonistic political entity, and is less focused on archaeology, being presented as a dark movie with gross-out elements, human sacrifice and torture.

Indiana Jones and the Last Crusade (1989)

The third film is set in 1938. Indiana and his friend Marcus Brody (Denholm Elliott) are assigned by American businessman Walter Donovan (Julian Glover) to find the Holy Grail. They are teamed up with Dr. Elsa Schneider (Alison Doody), following on from where Indiana's estranged father Henry (Sean Connery) left off before he disappeared. It transpires that Donovan and Elsa are in league with the Nazis, who captured Henry Jones in order to get Indiana to help them find the Grail. However, Indiana recovers his father's diary filled with his research, and manages to rescue him before finding the location of the Grail. Both Donovan and Elsa fall to the temptation of the Grail, while Indiana and Henry realize that their relationship with each other is more important than finding the relic.

Indiana Jones and the Kingdom of the Crystal Skull (2008)

The fourth film is set in 1957, nineteen years after The Last Crusade. Indiana is having a quiet life teaching before being thrust into a new adventure. He races against agents of the Soviet Union, led by Irina Spalko (Cate Blanchett) for a crystal skull. His journey takes him across Nevada, Connecticut, Peru, and the Amazon rainforest in Brazil. Indiana is faced with betrayal by one of his best friends, Mac (Ray Winstone), is introduced to a greaser named Mutt Williams (Shia LaBeouf), who turns out to be his son (his real name revealed to be Henry Jones III), and is reunited with, and eventually marries, Marion Ravenwood, who was the lead female character introduced in the first movie.

Indiana Jones and the Dial of Destiny (2023)

A fifth film, set in 1969, is scheduled for release on June 30, 2023. The film is being directed by James Mangold, who wrote the script with Jez and John-Henry Butterworth. Spielberg was initially set to direct the film, before passing it to Mangold. Spielberg instead serves as a producer, along with Kennedy and Marshall. Ford reprises the title role, and new cast members include Phoebe Waller-Bridge, Mads Mikkelsen, Thomas Kretschmann, Boyd Holbrook, Shaunette Renée Wilson, Toby Jones and Antonio Banderas. Development of the film began in 2008, but the project stalled for years. Filming eventually began in the United Kingdom in June 2021 and wrapped in February 2022.

Television

The Young Indiana Jones Chronicles 

A television series titled The Young Indiana Jones Chronicles (1992–1996) featured three incarnations of the character: Sean Patrick Flanery played Indiana aged 16–21; Corey Carrier played an 8- to 10-year-old version in several episodes; and George Hall narrated the show as the 93-year-old Jones, who bookended each episode. Lucas began developing the series in 1990 as "edutainment" that would be more cerebral than the films. The show was his first collaboration with producer Rick McCallum, and he wrote the stories for each episode. Writers and directors on the show included Carrie Fisher, Frank Darabont, Vic Armstrong, Ben Burtt, Terry Jones, Nicolas Roeg, Mike Newell and Joe Johnston. In the Chronicles, Jones crosses paths with many historical figures, played by stars such as Daniel Craig, Christopher Lee, Bob Peck, Jeffrey Wright, Marc Warren, Catherine Zeta-Jones, Elizabeth Hurley, Anne Heche, Vanessa Redgrave, Julian Fellowes, Timothy Spall and Harrison Ford as a 50-year-old Indiana in one episode (taking the usual place of Hall).

The show was filmed in over 25 countries for over 150 weeks. Season one was shot from March 1991 to March 1992; the second season began two months later and wrapped in April 1993. The ABC network was unsure of Lucas's cerebral approach, and attempted to advertise the series as an action-adventure like the films. Ratings were good if unspectacular, and ABC was nervous enough to put the show on hiatus after six episodes until September 1992. With only four episodes left of the second season to air, ABC eventually sold the show to the Family Channel, who changed the format from 50-minute episodes to 90-minute TV movies. Filming for the final four episodes took place from January 1994 to May 1996. The Young Indiana Jones Chronicles received a mixed reception from fans, although it won 10 Emmy Awards out of 23 nominations, as well as a 1994 Golden Globe nomination for Best Drama series. It was also an experimentation ground in digital effects for Lucasfilm.

The original broadcast versions of some episodes were briefly released in Japan on laserdisc in 1993 and on VHS in 1994. However, Lucas drastically reedited and restructured the show for its worldwide home video release. Major structural changes were made, including the complete removal of the 'bookend' sections narrated by the 93-year-old Jones, and the editing of all the one-hour episodes together into two-hour episodes. Approximately half of the series was released on VHS in various markets around the world in 1999, but the entire series was not released until its DVD debut, in a series of three boxsets released from 2007 to 2008, to tie in with the theatrical debut of Kingdom of the Crystal Skull. Among other extras, the DVDs include approximately 100 new historical featurettes.

Upcoming series 
In November 2022, it was reported that Lucasfilm was developing an Indiana Jones series for Disney+. Writers are currently being searched for the series.

Cast and crew

Cast

Additional crew and production details

Reception

Box office performance

Critical and public response

Accolades
The series has been nominated for 14 Academy Awards, of which they have won 7. Raiders of the Lost Ark was also given a Special Achievement Award for Best Sound Effects Editing.

Raiders of the Lost Ark (1981)

Indiana Jones and the Temple of Doom (1984)

Indiana Jones and the Last Crusade (1989)

Indiana Jones and the Kingdom of the Crystal Skull (2008)

Other media

Novels
A novelization of Raiders of the Lost Ark was written by Campbell Black and published by Ballantine Books in April 1981. It was followed by Indiana Jones and the Temple of Doom, written by James Kahn and published by Ballantine in May 1984. Finally, Indiana Jones and the Last Crusade was published in May 1989, and was the first Indiana Jones book by Rob MacGregor. A fan of the first two films, MacGregor admitted that writing the novelization made him "somewhat disappointed" with the third film, as he had expanded the script whereas Steven Spielberg had cut scenes to tighten the story.

George Lucas asked MacGregor to continue writing original novels for Bantam Books. These were geared toward an adult or young adult audience, and were prequels set in the 1920s or early 1930s after Jones graduates from college. Of the film characters, Lucas only permitted Marcus Brody to appear. He asked MacGregor to base the books on real myths, but except for the deletion of a sex scene, the writer was given total creative freedom. His six books – Indiana Jones and the Peril at Delphi, Indiana Jones and the Dance of the Giants, Indiana Jones and the Seven Veils, Indiana Jones and the Genesis Deluge, Indiana Jones and the Unicorn's Legacy, and Indiana Jones and the Interior World – were published from February 1991 to November 1992. The Genesis Deluge, published in February 1992 and featuring Noah's Ark, was the best-selling novel; MacGregor felt this was because it "had a strong following among religious-oriented people [...] because they tend to take the Noah's Ark story to heart and think of it as history and archaeological fact, rather than myth." MacGregor's favorite book was The Seven Veils, which featured real-life explorer Percy Fawcett and the death of Indiana's wife, Deirdre Campbell.

Martin Caidin wrote the next two novels in Bantam's series, Indiana Jones and the Sky Pirates and Indiana Jones and the White Witch. These feature Gale Parker as Indiana's sidekick; they introduced afterwords to the series, regarding each novel's historical context.

Caidin became ill, so Max McCoy took over in 1995 and wrote the final four novels: Indiana Jones and the Philosopher's Stone, Indiana Jones and the Dinosaur Eggs, Indiana Jones and the Hollow Earth, and Indiana Jones and the Secret of the Sphinx. McCoy set his books closer in time to the events of Raiders of the Lost Ark, which led to his characterizing Indiana as "a bit darker". The prolog of his first book featured a crystal skull, and this became a recurring story, concluding when Jones gives it up in the final novel. Lucas's involvement with McCoy's novels was limited, although LucasFilm censored sexual or outlandish elements in order to make the books appeal to younger readers; they also rejected the theme of time travel in the final book. Sallah, Lao Che, Rene Belloq and the Nazis made appearances, and McCoy also pitted Jones against Benito Mussolini's fascists and the Japanese. Jones also has a doomed romance with Alecia Dunstin, a librarian at the British Museum. A novel involving the Spear of Destiny was dropped, because Dark Horse Comics was developing the idea and later DC Comics developed the idea.

The books were only published in paperback, as the series editor felt readers would not be prepared to pay the hardback price for an adventure novel.

In February 2008, the novelizations of the first three films were published in one edition; James Rollins' Kingdom of the Crystal Skull novelization arrived the following May. Children's novelizations of all four films were published by Scholastic in 2008.

MacGregor was said to be writing new books for Ballantine for early 2009, but none have been published.

A new adult adventure, Indiana Jones and the Army of the Dead by Steve Perry, was released in September 2009.

A novel based on the video game Indiana Jones and the Staff of Kings, written by MacGregor to coincide with the release of the game, was canceled due to problems around the game's production.

Additionally, German author Wolfgang Hohlbein wrote eight Indiana Jones novels in the early 1990s, which were never translated to English.

List of novels
All of the following were published by Bantam Books, with the exception of Army of the Dead, which was published by Del Rey.
 Indiana Jones and the Peril at Delphi (Feb 1991) – by Rob Macgregor
 Indiana Jones and the Dance of the Giants (June 1991) – by Rob Macgregor
 Indiana Jones and the Seven Veils (Dec 1991) – by Rob Macgregor
 Indiana Jones and the Genesis Deluge (Feb 1992) – by Rob Macgregor
 Indiana Jones and the Unicorn's Legacy (Sept 1992) – by Rob Macgregor
 Indiana Jones and the Interior World (1992) – by Rob Macgregor
 Indiana Jones and the Sky Pirates (Dec 1993) – by Martin Caidin
 Indiana Jones and the White Witch (1994) – by Martin Caidin
 Indiana Jones and the Philosopher's Stone (1995) – by Max McCoy
 Indiana Jones and the Dinosaur Eggs (1996) – by Max McCoy
 Indiana Jones and the Hollow Earth (1997) – by Max McCoy
 Indiana Jones and the Secret of the Sphinx (1999) – by Max McCoy
 Indiana Jones and the Army of the Dead (2009) – by Steve Perry

Indiana Jones novels by Wolfgang Hohlbein:
 Indiana Jones und das Schiff der Götter (1990) – (Indiana Jones and the Longship of the Gods)
 Indiana Jones und die Gefiederte Schlange (1990) – (Indiana Jones and the Feathered Snake)
 Indiana Jones und das Gold von El Dorado (1991) – (Indiana Jones and the Gold of El Dorado)
 Indiana Jones und das verschwundene Volk (1991) – (Indiana Jones and the Lost People)
 Indiana Jones und das Schwert des Dschingis Khan (1991) – (Indiana Jones and the Sword of Genghis Khan)
 Indiana Jones und das Geheimnis der Osterinseln (1992) – (Indiana Jones and the Secret of Easter Island)
 Indiana Jones und das Labyrinth des Horus (1993) – (Indiana Jones and the Labyrinth of Horus)
 Indiana Jones und das Erbe von Avalon (1994) – (Indiana Jones and the Legacy of Avalon)

Children's novels

Find Your Fate
Ballantine Books published a number of Indiana Jones books in the Find Your Fate line, written by various authors. These books were similar to the Choose Your Own Adventure series, allowing the reader to select from options that change the outcome of the story. Indiana Jones books comprised 11 of the 17 releases in the line, which was initially titled Find Your Fate Adventure.
 Indiana Jones and the Curse of Horror Island (June 1984) – R. L. Stine
 Indiana Jones and the Lost Treasure of Sheba (June 1984) – Rose Estes
 Indiana Jones and the Giants of the Silver Tower (Aug 1984) – R. L. Stine
 Indiana Jones and the Eye of the Fates (Aug 1984) – Richard Wenk
 Indiana Jones and the Cup of the Vampire (Oct 1984) – Andy Helfer
 Indiana Jones and the Legion of Death (Dec 1984) – Richard Wenk
 Indiana Jones and the Cult of the Mummy's Crypt (Feb 1985) – R. L. Stine
 Indiana Jones and the Dragon of Vengeance (Apr 1985) – Megan Stine and H. William Stine
 Indiana Jones and the Gold of Genghis Khan (May 1985) – Ellen Weiss
 Indiana Jones and the Ape Slaves of Howling Island (1986) – R. L. Stine
 Indiana Jones and the Mask of the Elephant (Feb 1987) – Megan Stine and H. William Stine

Scholastic
In 2008, Scholastic released a series of middle-grade novels based on the stories and screenplays. Each book of this edition included several pages of color stills from filming.
 Indiana Jones and the Raiders of the Lost Ark – Ryder Windham
 Indiana Jones and the Temple of Doom – Suzanne Weyn
 Indiana Jones and the Last Crusade – Ryder Windham

In May 2009, two new middle-grade books were to begin a new series of Untold Adventures, though no further books appeared.
 Indiana Jones and the Pyramid of the Sorcerer – Ryder Windham
 Indiana Jones and the Mystery of Mount Sinai – J.W. Rinzler

Young Indiana Jones
In the early 1990s, different book series featured childhood and young adult adventures of Indiana Jones in the early decades of the century. Not all were directly tied to the Young Indiana Jones Chronicles TV series.

Random House
The following books are set in Indy's mid- to late-teen years.
 Young Indiana Jones and the Plantation Treasure (1990) – by William McCay
 Young Indiana Jones and the Tomb of Terror (1990) – by Les Martin
 Young Indiana Jones and the Circle of Death (1990) – by William McCay
 Young Indiana Jones and the Secret City (1990) – by Les Martin
 Young Indiana Jones and the Princess of Peril (1991) – by Les Martin
 Young Indiana Jones and the Gypsy Revenge (1991) – by Les Martin
 Young Indiana Jones and the Ghostly Riders (1991) – by William McCay
 Young Indiana Jones and the Curse of Ruby Cross – by William McCay
 Young Indiana Jones and the Titanic Adventure (1993) – by Les Martin
 Young Indiana Jones and the Lost Gold of Durango (1993) – by Megan Stine and H. William Stine
 Young Indiana Jones and the Face of the Dragon – by William McCay
 Young Indiana Jones and the Journey to the Underworld (1994) – by Megan Stine and H. William Stine
 Young Indiana Jones and the Mountain of Fire (1994) – by William McCay
 Young Indiana Jones and the Pirates' Loot (1994) – by J.N. Fox
 Young Indiana Jones and the Eye of the Tiger (1995) – by William McCay
 Young Indiana Jones and the Mask of the Madman (unpublished) – by Megan Stine and H. William Stine
 Young Indiana Jones and the Ring of Power (unpublished) – Megan Stine

Random House
These books were novelizations of episodes of the TV series. Some feature Indy around age 8; others have him age 16–18.
 The Young Indiana Jones Chronicles: The Mummy's Curse – by Megan Stine and H. William Stine
 The Young Indiana Jones Chronicles: Field of Death – by Les Martin
 The Young Indiana Jones Chronicles: Safari Sleuth – by A.L. Singer
 The Young Indiana Jones Chronicles: The Secret Peace – by William McCay
 The Young Indiana Jones Chronicles: The Trek of Doom – by Les Martin
 The Young Indiana Jones Chronicles: Revolution! – by Gavin Scott
 The Young Indiana Jones Chronicles: Race to Danger – by Stephanie Calmenson
 The Young Indiana Jones Chronicles: Prisoner of War – by Sam Mclean

Bantam Books
These are labeled Choose Your Own Adventure books. Like the TV series, some feature Indy around age 8, others age 16–18.

The Young Indiana Jones Chronicles:
 The Valley of the Kings – by Richard Brightfield
 South of the Border – by Richard Brightfield
 Revolution in Russia – by Richard Brightfield
 Masters of the Louvre – by Richard Brightfield
 African Safari – by Richard Brightfield
 Behind the Great Wall – by Richard Brightfield
 The Roaring Twenties – by Richard Brightfield
 The Irish Rebellion – by Richard Brightfield

Ballantine Books
Young Indiana Jones:
 The Mata Hari Affair – by James Luceno
 The Mummy's Curse – by Parker Smith

Graphic novels
 The Curse of the Jackal – by Dan Barry
 The Search for the Oryx – by Dan Barry
 The Peril of the Fort – by Dan Barry

Non-fiction books
 Lost Diaries of Young Indiana Jones – by Eric D. Weiner
 The Young Indiana Jones Chronicles: On the Set and Behind the Scenes – by Dan Madsen
 Indiana Jones Explores Ancient Egypt – by John Malam
 Indiana Jones Explores Ancient Rome – by John Malam
 Indiana Jones Explores Ancient Greece – by John Malam
 Indiana Jones Explores The Vikings – by John Malam
 Indiana Jones Explores The Incas – by John Malam
 Indiana Jones Explores The Aztecs – by John Malam

Comic books

Video games
Since the release of the original film, there have been a number of video games based on the Indiana Jones series. These include both games based on (or derived from) the films, as well as those featuring the characters in new storylines.

Games adapted or derived from the films
 Raiders of the Lost Ark (1982, Atari Inc) – The first Indiana Jones video game. Released on the Atari 2600.
 Indiana Jones and the Temple of Doom (1985, Atari Games) – Arcade game, later converted to many home computer and console formats, including an NES version in 1988.
 Indiana Jones a Chrám zkázy (1985, František Fuka) – A Czech text adventure game based on Temple of Doom.
 Indiana Jones and the Last Crusade: The Action Game (1989, LucasArts) – One of two Last Crusade-based games released by LucasArts in 1989.
 Indiana Jones and the Last Crusade: The Graphic Adventure (1989, LucasArts)
 Indiana Jones and the Last Crusade (1991, Taito) – Released for the NES console.
 Indiana Jones' Greatest Adventures (1994, JVC/LucasArts) – The final film adaptation until 2008, based upon all three original films. Released on the Super Nintendo Entertainment System.
 Lego Indiana Jones: The Original Adventures (2008, LucasArts) – Based on the original three movies and the Lego toy franchise.
 Lego Indiana Jones 2: The Adventure Continues (2009, LucasArts) – A sequel to the original Lego Indiana Jones game.

Original games
 Indiana Jones in the Lost Kingdom (1985, Mindscape)
 Indiana Jones in Revenge of the Ancients (1987, Mindscape) – Released for the Apple II and PC DOS computer platforms.
 Indiana Jones and the Fate of Atlantis (1992, LucasArts) – Released for DOS (IBM PC) compatibles in 1992.
 The Young Indiana Jones Chronicles (1993, Jaleco) – Released for the NES console.
 Instruments of Chaos starring Young Indiana Jones (1994, Sega) – Released for the Sega Genesis
 Indiana Jones and His Desktop Adventures (1996, LucasArts)
 Indiana Jones and the Infernal Machine (1999, LucasArts) – Released in 1999 on the PC, as well as for the Nintendo 64
 Indiana Jones and the Infernal Machine (2D version) (2001, LucasArts) – A 2D version of Infernal Machine released for the Game Boy Color
 Indiana Jones and the Emperor's Tomb (2003, LucasArts) – a prequel to Temple of Doom. Released on the PlayStation 2, Xbox and Microsoft Windows in 2003.
 Indiana Jones and the Staff of Kings (2009, LucasArts) – Released in June 2009 for the Nintendo DS, Wii, PSP and PS2.
 Indiana Jones and the Lost Puzzles (2009, THQ) – Developed by Universomo and published by THQ Wireless for BlackBerry, iOS, and Windows Mobile.
 Indiana Jones Adventure World (2011, Zynga) – The social gaming company Zynga partnered with Lucasfilm to produce this game late 2011.
 Untitled Indiana Jones game (TBA, Bethesda Softworks, MachineGames, Lucasfilm Games) – a new game announced to be in development, with Todd Howard executive producing.

Cancelled games
 Indiana Jones and the Iron Phoenix – An intended sequel to The Fate of Atlantis, intended for a 1995 release, but was cancelled.
 Core Design developed a game around 2006 as a reskin of a cancelled Tomb Raider game, but this incarnation was not successful either.

Other
 Indiana Jones appears in Fortnite: Battle Royale (2017, Epic Games) as part of the Chapter 3 - Season 3 Battle pass.

Theme park attractions

Prior to Disney's acquisition, George Lucas collaborated with Walt Disney Imagineering on several occasions to create Indiana Jones attractions for Walt Disney Parks and Resorts worldwide. Indiana Jones-themed attractions and appearances at Disney theme parks include:
 The Indiana Jones Epic Stunt Spectacular! show opened at Disney's Hollywood Studios in Lake Buena Vista, Florida, in 1989.
 The Indiana Jones et le Temple du Péril roller-coaster opened at Disneyland Paris in Marne-la-Vallée, France, in 1993.
 The Indiana Jones Adventure, which opened at Disneyland in Anaheim, California, in 1995 and at Tokyo DisneySea in Chiba, Japan, in 2001.
 An Indiana Jones-themed bar lounge, "Jock Lindsey's Hangar Bar", opened in 2015 at Disney Springs at the Walt Disney World Resort.
 The Great Movie Ride at Disney's Hollywood Studios featured a scene based on Raiders of the Lost Ark.

Toy lines

For the holiday season following the June 1981 debut of Raiders of the Lost Ark, Kenner produced a 12-inch-tall "Authentically styled Action Figure" of Indiana Jones. The next spring they delivered nine smaller-scale (3") action figures, three playsets, replicas of the German desert convoy truck and Jones's horse, all derived from the Raiders movie. They also offered a Raiders board game.

In conjunction with the theatrical release of The Temple of Doom in 1984, TSR, Inc. released miniature metal versions of twelve characters from both films for a role playing game. LJN Toys Ltd. also released action figures of Jones, Mola Ram, and the Giant Thugee.

No toys were produced to tie in with The Last Crusade in 1989

Hasbro released toys based on Raiders of the Lost Ark and Kingdom of the Crystal Skull in 2008. Further figures, including characters from The Temple of Doom and The Last Crusade, followed later in the year, but were distributed on a very limited basis. This line of toys included 3-inch and 12-inch figures, vehicles, a playset, and a series of "Adventure Heroes" aimed at young children. Hasbro announced the cancellation of the line in the fall of 2008, due to decreasing sales, although some figures continued to be released up until the 2011 San Diego Comic Convention.

Sideshow Collectibles, Gentle Giant, Diamond Select Toys and Kotobukiya also earned Indiana Jones licensing rights in 2008. Lego released eight play sets to coincide with the fourth film, based on Raiders and The Last Crusade as well as on Kingdom of the Crystal Skull

Merchandise featuring franchise cross-overs include a Mr. Potato Head "Taters Of The Lost Ark" set by Hasbro, Mickey Mouse as Indiana Jones, and a Muppets-branded Adventure Kermit action figure, produced by Palisades Toys and based on the frog's appearance in the Disney World stunt show as seen in The Muppets at Walt Disney World.

Disney Vinylmation introduced a series based on Indiana Jones characters in 2014.

Role-playing games
There have been two publications of role-playing games based on the Indiana Jones franchise. The Adventures of Indiana Jones Role-Playing Game was designed and published by TSR, Inc. under license in 1984. Ten years later, West End Games acquired the rights to publish their own version, The World of Indiana Jones.

Pinball

A pinball machine based on the first three films was released in 1993. Stern Pinball released a new edition in 2008, which featured all four movies.

See also
Tomb Raider
Uncharted
The Librarian

References
Footnotes

Citations

Sources

Further reading

External links

 Indiana Jones series at Box Office Mojo
 Indiana Jones franchise at The Numbers
 Indiana Jones Disney+ Series

 
Film series introduced in 1981
Action film franchises
Adventure film series
Lucasfilm franchises
Paramount Pictures franchises
American film series
Nazism in fiction